Slaves to Society is the ninth studio album by American-Czech death metal band Master.

Track listing
 "The Final Skull"  – 3:57
 "In Control" – 4:05
 "Beaten for the Possibility"  – 3:30
 "Slaves to Society"  – 3:29
 "The Darkest Age"  – 3:51
 "Cheater"  – 3:37
 "Anarchy Nearly Lost"  – 3:05
 "The Room with Views"  – 4:57
 "Remnants of Hate"  – 4:36
 "The Last Chapter"  – 4:22
 "World Police"  – 6:04

Credits
 Paul Speckmann – vocals, bass
 Aleš "Alex 93" Nejezchleba – guitar
 Zdeněk "Zdenál" Pradlovský – drums

2007 albums
Master (American band) albums